Peter van Dievoet (French: Pierre, Dutch: Peeter, Latin: Petrus; 16611729) was a sculptor, statuary, wood carver, and designer of ornamental architectural features from Brussels. He achieved fame for his work on a number of the Baroque guild houses of the Grand-Place (Brussels' main square), which was rebuilt after the bombardment of 1695, as well as on the Statue of James II in Trafalgar Square, London. He was the brother of Philippe van Dievoet, goldsmith to King Louis XIV of France and the uncle of the Parisian printer Guillaume Vandive.

Biography 
Peter van Dievoet was born into the Van Dievoet family in Brussels and baptised at the Church of St. Michael and St. Gudula (now Brussels' cathedral) on 29 June 1661. He was born from the second marriage of Gilles van Dievoet, bourgeois of Brussels, to Gertrude Zeevaert. Gilles van Dievoet (? - † before 1672) had a previous marriage with Catherine Slachmeulder, with whom he had among others: Philippe van Dievoet, goldsmith of King Louis XIV of France. The young Peter was therefore fatherless around the age of twelve or thirteen. His mother later remarried, and died on 22 July 1705. 

After some time in Brussels, he moved to England where he was a regular visitor to the studio of Grinling Gibbons. In 1686, he cast and made the statue of James II for St. James's Park in London, now in Trafalgar Square. He returned to Brussels due to the Glorious Revolution of 1688. In 1695, he was master of the Quatre-Couronnés at Brussels, the guild of stonemasons and sculptors. He was an acclaimed sculptor and was involved in the construction of the new Grand-Place in its Baroque style. He was a member (one of "The Eight") then a judge (or "Dean") of the Drapery Court of Brussels from 1713 to 1723.

Career

Time in London (1680–1688)
According to Edmond Marchal, Van Dievoet's most important works are in England and are "among the best of that time". He worked in London in the studio of Quaker sculptor Grinling Gibbons for almost eight years, from 1680 to 1688. His English production (mainly sculptures) remains poorly known because little research has been done to find and inventory it. George Vertue mentions him only as statuary. The same George Vertue, who had found an agreement and a receipt of payment for this work, attributes to him, in collaboration with a certain Laurens of Mechelen, the bronze statue of James II (1686) in the courtyard of Whitehall, currently in Trafalgar Square. Margaret Whinney notes that this statue does not have an English but rather a continental character and gives it the same attribution: "two Flemings, Laurens of Mechelen and Dievot of Brussels (sic), were employed to model and make it." This attribution is repeated by Sir Lionel Henri Cust: "Dyvoet (sic) ... and Laurens ... who executed the statue of James II at Whitehall." The fore-mentioned Laurens is identified by Paul-Eugène Claessens as the sculptor Laurence Vander Meulen from Mechlin.

Return to Brussels (1689–1729)

Having returned to his hometown around 1689, Van Dievoet had to meet the requirements of the corporate institution and enrol in the corporation of the Quatre-Couronnés, the Guild of the stonemasons, of which he was officially received as master in 1695. It is at this date that his work in Brussels begins. That same year, Brussels was destroyed by the French bombardment. 

Already during his lifetime, Van Dievoet was considered a renowned sculptor. Long after his death, a report of the magistrates of Brussels to Prince Charles Alexander of Lorraine, Governor of the Habsburg Netherlands, dated 27 September 1771, quotes Van Dievoet in a list of "very remarkable Brussels sculptors". From his Brussels work, we still know only of the pieces mentioned by Guillaume Des Marez, while waiting for other "discoveries" or authentications. He is mainly known there for his realisations and conceptions of many of the guild houses of the famous Grand-Place.

The following are his work as described by Des Marez:

The House of the White Lamb

The sculptures on the facade of the 1696-built House of the White Lamb (Maison de l'Agneau Blanc) on the / are the work of Van Dievoet.

The Grand-Place

Van Dievoet sculpted the facades of the following guild halls on the Grand-Place: La Maison du Sac (Grand-Place, number 4), La Maison du Cornet (number 6), La Maison de l'Arbre d'Or or the House of Brewers (number 10), La Maison de la Chaloupe d'Or (number 24-25). He was also the architect for Le Heaume (number 34).

Wood carving
Van Dievoet is also the author of finely chiseled woodcarvings, as shown, for example, by the extremely elaborate lime-wood ornamentation of festoons and fruits, which is preserved at the Royal Museums of Art and History of Brussels. He also carved out of wood, "keerses" which are richly decorated emblems, used for celebrations, for the tailors' guild.

Public functions
Van Dievoet continued his career by exercising public functions. From 1713 to 1723, between ages 52 and 62, he was one of The Eight and then Dean (judge) of the Drapery Court, an old Brussels institution that can be compared to a chamber of commerce, and whose members were called the "brothers of the Guild". At the end of this term, from 1723 to 1724, between ages 62 and 63, he became a member of the magistrate by becoming a Councilor of the City of Brussels. After that, he left public life. A pious man, he had been, until the end of his life, a marguillier (churchwarden) of the Church of St. Michael and St. Gudula. He died in Brussels on 2 March 1729, at 68.

Arms
Gallery:

See also

 Brussels school of sculpture
 Drapery Court of Brussels
 Guilds of Brussels
 Bourgeois of Brussels
 Van Dievoet family

Notes and references

Further reading
 — « La généalogie et l'héraldique au service de l'histoire de l'art », in L'Intermédiaire des généalogistes, n° 137, Brussels, 1968.
 — « Généalogie de Brou (x) », in L'Intermédiaire des généalogistes, n° 122, Brussels, 1966, p. 88.
 — La Grand'Place de Bruxelles, illustrations de Van Gucht, Brussels, galerie Ex-Libris, s.d., n° 10.
 Philippe Baert, Mémoires sur les sculpteurs et architectes des Pays-Bas, edited by Baron de Reiffenberg, Brussels, 1848, p. 117.
 Bénézit, Dictionnaire critique et documentaire des peintres, sculpteurs, dessinateurs et graveurs, Paris, 1955, vol. 3, p. 268 et ibid. Paris, 1956, vol. 4, p. 238.
 Bénézit, Dictionary of Artists, 2006, vol.4, p. 911.
 Edwin Beresford Chancellor, The Romance of Soho. Being an Account of the District, Its Past Distinguished Inhabitants,  1931, p. 32.
 David Blayney Brown, Catalogue of the Collection of Drawings in the Ashmolean Museum, Ashmolean Museum - Art, 1982, p. 637.
 Andrée Brunard, "La Grand-Place, joyau de la Capitale", in, Les Belles Heures de Bruxelles, Paris-Bruxelles, 1952, p. 170.
 J. E. Buschman, Annales de l'Académie d'archéologie de Belgique, Bruxelles, 1867, p. 486 et p. 507.
 Paul-Eugène Claessens et Julien Cuypers, "Quand Bruxelles ravagée renaît plus belle sous les ailes de l'archange : le sculpteur Pierre van Dievoet, son œuvre et sa famille", in Intermédiaire des généalogistes, no. 121, Brussels, 1966, pp. 39–41.
 Maurice Culot, Eric Hennaut, Marie Demanet, Caroline Mierop, Le bombardement de Bruxelles par Louis XIV et la reconstruction qui s'en suivit 1695-1700, Brussels, 1992, p. 218 (Contrat d'adjudication de la maison du Cornet, Grand-Place)
 Allan Cunningham, The Lives of the Most Eminent British Painters and Sculptors, vol III, New York, 1835, p. 14.
 Sir Lionel Henri Cust, "Grinling Gibbons", Dictionary of National Biography, London, 1949–56, vol. VII, p. 1140.
 M. J. De Decker, "Relevé de l'Agneau Blanc", (deuxième prix partagé, S.C.A.B. concours annuel de relevés de 1924), dans, L'Émulation, Brussels, 1925, plate 8.
 Guillaume Des Marez, Guide illustré de Bruxelles, Brussels, 1928, vol. 1, pp. 65, 81, 82, 89, 90, 92, 112, and vol. 11, p. 182.
 Guillaume Des Marez, "Les transformations de la ville de Bruxelles au XVIIème siècle et les métiers de la construction", Études inédites, Brussels, 1936, p. 135.
 Pieter D'Hondt, L'académie royale, notice historique, Brussels, s.d., p. 21.
 George Godwin, John Britton, The Churches of London: A History and Description of the Ecclesiastical Edifices of the Metropolis, 1839.
 David Green, Grinling Gibbons his work as carver and statuary, 1648-1721, Londres, 1964, pp. 56, 194.
Great men of Great Britain, Cyclopaedia, Great Britain, 1866, p. 109.
 Rupert Gunnis, Dictionary of British Sculptors 1660–1851, London, 1953, pp. 130, 169, 406.
 Alexandre Henne et Alphonse Wauters, Histoire de la ville de Bruxelles, Bruxelles, 1845, vol. II, p. 556 ; Mina Martens, Index général, Brussels, 1972, s.v. "Dievoet".
 Mary Botham Howitt, Howitt's Journal of Literature and Popular Progress, William Howitt, 1847, p. 408.
 Johannes Immerzeel, De levens en werken der Hollandsche en Vlaamsche kunstschilders, beeldhouvers, graveurs, Amsterdam, 1842, p. 278.
 Chevalier Edmond Marchal, Mémoire sur la Sculpture aux Pays-Bas pendant les XVII et XVIII siècles, Brussels, 1877, pp. 3, 12, 82, 190; La sculpture et les chefs-d'œuvre de l'orfèvrerie belges, Brussels, 1895, pp. 468, 5S3, 743.
 Dr. Kurt Zoege von Manteuffel, "Dievoet (Dievot), van Bildhauer in Brüssel", in Ulrich Thieme and Felix Becker (eds.), Allgemeines Lexicon des bildenden Künstler von der Antike bis zur gegenwart, Leipzig, 1913, vol. IX, p. 279.
 Victor-Gaston Martiny, "Le décor architectural de la Grand-Place", La Grand-Place de Bruxelles, Brussels and Liège, 1966, p. 122.
 André Monteyne, De Brusselaars in een stad die anders is, 1981, pp. 127, 367.
 Dr. Georg Kaspar Nagler, Neues Allgemeines Künstler- Lexicon, Munich, 1836, vol. III, p. 404.
 Henry-Charles van Parys, "Van Dievoet : réponse", L'Intermédiaire des généalogistes, no. 148, Brussels, 1970, p. 254.
 Alexandre Pinchart, Archives des arts, sciences et lettres, documents inédits, Gand, 1860, vol. I, p. 40.
 L. G. G. Ramsey, The Concise Encyclopedia of Antiques, The Connoisseur, London, 1901, p. 155.
 Viviane Roothooft, De Grote Markt te Brussel, Bruxelles, 1978, p. 13.
 Georges Sion, Bruxelles ou les contes de Mille et un ans, Bruxelles, 1979, pp. 170 et 174.
 Félix Stappaerts, "Pierre van Dievoet", Biographie Nationale de Belgique, Brussels, 1878, vol. VI, column 74; Brussels, 1936–1938, vol. XXVI, column 385.
 H. Avray Tipping, Grinling Gibbons and the Wood-work of his age (1648-1720), London, 1914, pp. 95, 125, 251.
 Alain Van Dievoet, "Les Vandive, consuls de Paris", L'Intermédiaire des généalogistes, no. 180, Brussels, 1975, pp. 452 à 453.
 Alain Van Dievoet, Une famille d'orfèvres et consuls de Paris d'origine bruxelloise : les van Dievoet dits van Dive, Bruxelles, 1976, passim (xérocopié).
 Alain Van Dievoet, "Question sur le sculpteur Pierre van Dievoet", L'Intermédiaire des généalogistes, no. 147, Brussels, 1970, p. 185.
 Alain Van Dievoet, "Un disciple belge de Grinling Gibbons, le sculpteur Pierre van Dievoet (1661-1729) et son œuvre à Londres et Bruxelles", Le Folklore brabançon, March 1980, no. 225, pp. 65-91.
 Alain Van Dievoet, "Généalogie de la famille van Dievoet originaire de Bruxelles, dite van Dive à Paris", Le Parchemin, Brussels, 1986, no. 245, pp. 273-293.
 Alain Van Dievoet, "Quand le savoir-faire des orfèvres bruxellois brillait à Versailles", Cahiers bruxellois, Brussels, 2004, pp. 19-66.
 Marcel Vanhamme, Bruxelles. Promenades dans le Passé, Brussels, 1949, pp. 76, 84.
 Louis Verniers, Un millénaire d'histoire de Bruxelles depuis les origines jusqu'en 1830, Brussels, 1965, pp. 364, 366, 644.
 George Vertue, Note Books, ed. Walpole Society, Oxford, 1930–47, vol. I, pp. 61, 82, 106; vol. IV, p. 50.
 George Vertue and Horace Walpole, Anecdotes of Painting in England, London, 1765, vol. III, p. 91.
 Alphonse Wauters, Liste des doyens des corps de métier de Bruxelles 1696-1795, Brussels, 1888, p. 55.
 Margaret Whinney, Sculpture in Britain, 1530 to 1830, London, 1964, p. 55.
 Dr. Alfred von Wurzbach, Niederländischer Künstler-Lexicon, Vienna and Leipzig, 1906, vol. I, p. 407.

External links
 The genealogy of the family of sculptor Peter Van Dievoet
 Van Dievoet, Pierre on the website of the British Museum
 Studies for a statue of a figure in Roman dress on the website of the British Museum

Belgian sculptors
Belgian woodcarvers
Flemish Baroque sculptors
1660s births
1729 deaths
Peter
Peter
Belgian expatriates in England